Aleksey Selikhov was a Russian equestrian. He competed in two events at the 1912 Summer Olympics.

References

External links
 

Year of birth missing
Year of death missing
Russian male equestrians
Olympic equestrians of Russia
Equestrians at the 1912 Summer Olympics
Place of birth missing